In  the traditional grammar of Modern English, a phrasal verb typically constitutes a single semantic unit composed of a verb followed by a particle (examples: turn down, run into or sit up), sometimes combined with a preposition (examples: get together with, run out of or feed off of). Alternative terms include verb-adverb combination, verb-particle construction, two-part word/verb or three-part word/verb (depending on the number of particles) and multi-word verb. 

Phrasal verbs ordinarily cannot be understood based upon the meanings of the individual parts alone but must be considered as a whole: the meaning is non-compositional and thus unpredictable. Phrasal verbs are differentiated from other classifications of multi-word verbs and free combinations by criteria based on idiomaticity, replacement by a single-word verb, wh-question formation and particle movement.

Types 

The category "phrasal verb" is mainly used in English as a second language teaching. Some textbooks restrict the term to verbs with particles in order to distinguish phrasal verbs from prepositional verbs. Others include verbs with prepositions under the same category and distinguish particle verbs and prepositional verbs as two types of phrasal verbs. 
Since a prepositional phrase can complement a particle verb, some explanations distinguish three types of phrasal verb constructions depending on whether the verb combines with a particle, a preposition phrase, or both, though the third type is not a distinct linguistic phenomenon.

Verb + particle (particle verbs)

Particle verbs (phrasal verbs in the strict sense) are two-word verbs composed of a simple verb and a particle extension that modifies its meaning. The particle is thus integrally collocated with the verb. In older grammars, the particle was usually analyzed as an adverb. 

a. Kids grow up so fast these days 
b. You shouldn't give in so easily. 

In these examples, the common verbs grow and give are expanded by the particles up and in. The resulting two-word verbs are single semantic units, so grow up and give in are listed as discrete entries in modern dictionaries.  

These verbs can be transitive or intransitive. If they are transitive, i.e. if they have an object, the particle may come either before or after the object of the verb.

c. She handed in her homework. 
d. She handed her homework in.
e. She handed it in.

When the object is a pronoun, the particle is usually placed afterwards. With nouns, it is a matter of familiar collocation or of emphasis.

Particles commonly used in this construction include to, in, into, out, up, down, at, on, off, under, against. All these words can also be used as prepositions, but the prepositional use is distinct, and modern dictionaries may list, for example, to (particle) and to (preposition) as separate lexemes. In the particle verb construction, they cannot be construed as prepositions because they are not being used as part of a prepositional phrase. 

f. You should think it over. – over cannot be a preposition, as it is not followed by a noun phrase.
g. Who thought up this scheme? – although up is followed by a noun phrase, it is linked to the verb (to think up) not to the noun (*up this scheme), so not a preposition.

Verb + preposition (prepositional verbs)

Many verbs can be complemented by a prepositional phrase that functions adverbially: 
a. Don't stand on the table. 
This construction is sometimes also taught as a phrasal verb, but only when the combination of verb and preposition is not intuitive to the learner: 
b. Don't stand on ceremony.   

Further examples:
c. I ran into an old friend. – into is a preposition that introduces the prepositional phrase into an old friend. 
d. She takes after her mother. – after is a preposition that introduces the prepositional phrase after her mother.
e. Sam passes for a linguist. – for is a preposition that introduces the prepositional phrase for a linguist.
f. You should stand by your friend. – by is a preposition that introduces the prepositional phrase by your friend

Verb + particle + preposition (particle-prepositional verbs)

Sometimes both phenomena can occur in the same context.

a. Who can put up with that? – up is a particle and with is a preposition.
b. She looks forward to a rest. – forward is a particle and to is a preposition.
c. The other tanks bore down on my Panther. – down is a particle and on is a preposition.
d. They really teed off on me. – off is a particle and on is a preposition.
e. We loaded up on snacks. – up is a particle and on is a preposition
f. Susan had to sit in for me. – in is a particle and for is a preposition.

In general, the discrete meanings associated with phrasal verbs cannot be readily understood solely by construing the sum of their respective parts: the meaning of pick up is distinct from the various meanings of pick and up, and may acquire disparate meanings depending on its contextual usage. Similarly, the meaning of hang out is not conspicuously related to a particular definition of hang or out.

Distinguishing phrasal verb types
When a particle verb is transitive, it may be difficult to distinguish it from a prepositional verb. A simple diagnostic which works in many cases is to consider whether it is possible to shift the preposition/particle to after the noun. An English preposition can never follow its noun, so if we can change verb - P - noun to verb - noun - P, then P cannot be a preposition and must be particle. But even with a particle verb, shifting the particle is not always possible, for example if it is followed by a pronoun instead of a noun, or if there is a fixed collocation. Another diagnostic is to think about where the instinctive division would be if we had to take a breath in the middle of the phrase. A particle would naturally be grouped with the preceding verb, a preposition with the following noun phrase. In the following examples, an asterisk indicates an impossible form.

a. You can bank on Susan. – on is a preposition. The natural division is "bank | on Susan".
b. *You can bank Susan on. – The preposition cannot follow its noun.

a. You can take on Susan. – on is a particle. The natural division is "take on | Susan".
b. You can take Susan on. – The particle can follow the object of the particle verb.

a. He got over the situation. – over is a preposition. The natural division is "get | over the situation".
b. *He got the situation over. – The preposition cannot follow its noun.

a. He thought over the situation. – over is a particle. The natural division is "think over | the situation".
b. He thought the situation over. – The particle can follow the object of the particle verb.

Another test would be to place the verb in a w-question (which? who?) or a relative clause and consider whether the particle/preposition can be placed before the question word or relative pronoun. While this may sound antiquated, it is always possible with a preposition, never with a particle. (For more on an obsolete prescriptive rule about this, see preposition stranding.)

a. Who can you bank on? Susan is someone (who) you can bank on. – on is a preposition in terminal position.
b. On whom can you bank? Susan is a person on whom you can bank. – The preposition can go before the w-words.

a. Who can I take on? Susan is someone (who) any employer could take on. – on is a particle in terminal position.
b. *On whom can I take? *Susan is a person on whom any employer could take. – The particle cannot be moved. 

While this distinction is of interest to linguists, it is not necessarily important for language learners, and some textbooks recommend learning phrasal verbs as whole collocations without considering types.

Terminology
The terminology of phrasal verbs is inconsistent. Modern theories of syntax tend to use the term phrasal verb to denote particle verbs only; they do not view prepositional verbs as phrasal verbs. In contrast, literature in English as a second or foreign language ESL/EFL, tends to employ the term phrasal verb to encompass both prepositional and particle verbs.

Note that prepositions and adverbs can have a literal meaning that may be spatial or orientational. Many English verbs interact with a preposition or an adverb to yield a meaning that can be readily understood from the constituent elements.

He talked up the proposal.
She opened the shutters and looked outside.

These more readily understandable combinations are not usually regarded as phrasal verbs.

Furthermore, the same words that occur as a genuine phrasal verb can also appear in other contexts, as in:
1(a) She looked up his address. Phrasal verb.
1(b) She looked his address up. Phrasal verb.
2(a) When he heard the crash, he looked up. Not a phrasal verb.
2(b) When he heard the crash, he looked up at the sky. Not a phrasal verb.

The terminology used to denote the particle is also inconsistent. Sometimes it is called an adverb and at other times an intransitive prepositional phrase. The inconsistent use of terminology in these areas may be a source of confusion regarding what qualifies as a phrasal verb and the status of the particle or a preposition.

The term phrasal verb was first used by Logan Pearsall Smith, in Words and Idioms (1925), in which he states that the OED Editor Henry Bradley suggested the term to him. 

The value of this choice and its alternatives (including separable verb for Germanic languages) is debatable. In origin the concept is based on translation linguistics; as many single-word English and Latinate words are translatable by a phrasal verb complex in English, therefore the logic is that the phrasal verb complex must be a complete semantic unit in itself. One should consider in this regard that the actual term phrasal verb suggests that such constructions should form phrases. In most cases however, they clearly do not form phrases. Hence the very term phrasal verb is misleading and a source of confusion, which has motivated some to reject the term outright.

Shifting
A complex aspect of phrasal verbs concerns the syntax of particle verbs that are transitive (as discussed and illustrated above). These allow some variability, depending on the relative weight of the constituents involved. Shifting often occurs when the object is very light, e.g.

a. Fred chatted up the girl with red hair. – Canonical word order
b. Fred chatted her up. – Shifting occurs because the definite pronoun her is very light.
c. Fred chatted the girl up. - The girl is also very light.
d. ?Fred chatted the redhead up. - A three-syllable object can appear in either position for many speakers.
e. ??Fred chatted the girl with red hair up. – Shifting is unlikely unless it is sufficiently motivated by the weight of the constituents involved.

a. They dropped off the kids from that war zone. – Canonical word order
b. They dropped them off. – Shifting occurs because the definite pronoun them is very light.
c. ??They dropped the kids from that war zone off. – Shifting is unlikely unless it is sufficiently motivated by the weight of the constituents involved.

a. Mary made up a really entertaining story. – Canonical word order
b. Mary made it up. – Shifting occurs because the definite pronoun it is very light.
c. ??Mary made a really entertaining story up. – Shifting is unlikely unless it is sufficiently motivated by the weight of the constituents involved.

Shifting occurs between two (or more) sister constituents that appear on the same side of their head. The lighter constituent shifts leftward and the heavier constituent shifts rightward, and this happens to accommodate the relative weight of the two. Dependency grammar trees are again used to illustrate the point:

The trees illustrate when shifting can occur. English sentence structures that grow down and to the right are easier to process. There is a consistent tendency to place heavier constituents to the right, as is evident in the a-trees. Shifting is possible when the resulting structure does not contradict this tendency, as is evident in the b-trees. Note again that the particle verb constructions (in orange) qualify as catenae in both the a- and b-trees. Shifting does not alter this fact.

Similar constructions in other languages
Prepositional verbs are very common in many languages, though they would not necessarily be analyzed as a distinct verb type: they are simply verbs followed by prepositional phrases.

By contrast, particle verbs are much rarer in cross-language comparison. Middle English particle verbs developed from Old English prefixed verbs: OE inngan > English go in. They are related to the separable verbs in other Germanic languages, which can be seen historically as a parallel, though independent development. For example, in Dutch,  de lamp aansteken (to light the lamp) becomes ik steek de lamp aan (I light the lamp on) in a principal clause. 

A number of particle verbs exist in some Romance languages such as Lombard, spoken in Northern Italy, due to the influence of ancient Lombardic:
Fa foeura (to do in: to eat up; to squander);
Dà denter (to trade in; to bump into);
Borlà giò (to fall down);
Lavà sü (to wash up, as in English);
Trà sü (to throw up, as in English);
Trà vìa (to throw away, as in English);
Serà sü (to lock up, as in English);
Dà vià (to give away, as in English), and more.

Some of these made their way into Italian, for instance far fuori (to get rid of); mangiare fuori (to eat out); andare d'accordo con (to get on/along with); buttare via (throw away).

Compounding 
An extension of the concept of phrasal verb occurs via compounding when a verb+particle complex is nominalized. The particles may come before or after the verb. If it comes after, there may be a hyphen between the two parts of the compound noun.

to set out → outset: 
We set out on a quest for the holy grail.
Our quest was doomed from the outset
to put in → input: 
Don't be scared to put your own ideas in.
Try to come to the meeting – we'd value your input.
to stand by → standby: 
The fire brigade is standing by in case of emergency.
We are keeping the old equipment on standby in case of emergency.to back up → back-up:Neil will back you up if you need it
Neil will give you any backup you need.

Compounds which place the particle before the verb are of ancient development, and are common to all Germanic languages, as well as to Indo-European languages in general. This is related to the history of particle verbs, which developed out of Old English prefixed verbs. By contrast, compounds which put the particle second are a more modern development in English, and focus more on the action expressed by the compound.

See also

 Adverbial phrase
 Collocation
 Ergative verb
 Idiom
 Lexical unit
 Verb phrase

 References 

 Literature cited 

 
 
  (Cited from the revised ed. 1940).
 
 
 
 
 
 
 
 

 Further reading 
Adger, D. 2003. Core syntax: A minimalist approach. Oxford, UK: Oxford University Press.
Allerton, D. 2006. “Verbs and their satellites”, in The Handbook of Linguistics. Eds. B. Aarts & A. McMahaon. Malden, M.: Blackwell Publishing. pp. 126–49.
Farrell, P. 2005. “English verb-preposition constructions: Constituency and order”, Language, 81(1): 96-137. 
Haiden, M. 2006. “Verb particle constructions”, in The Blackwell companion to syntax, vol. 5. Eds. M. Everaert & H. van Riemsdijk. Malden, MA: Blackwell Publishing, pp. 344–75.
Juraffsky, D. and J. Martin. 2000. Speech and language processing. Dorling Kindersley, India: Pearson Education.
Huddleston, R. and G. Pullum 2002. The Cambridge grammar of the English language. Cambridge, UK: Cambridge University Press.
Knowles, M. and R Moon. 2006. Introducing metaphor. London: Routledge, 2006.
Long, T. (ed.). 1979. Longman dictionary of English idioms. Longman Group Limited.Macmillan phrasal verbs plus dictionary. 2005 Oxford: Macmillan Education 2005.
McCarthy M. and F. O'dell. 2007. English phrasal verbs in use. Cambridge University Press.
Osborne, T. and T. Groß 2012. “Constructions are catenae: Construction Grammar meets Dependency Grammar”, Cognitive Linguistics 23, 1: 163–214.Oxford phrasal verbs dictionary. 2001.
Tallerman, M. 1998. Understanding syntax''. London: Arnold.

External links

 Ordered list of phrasal verbs
 Write Back Soon A course by Radio Lingua, which aims to help English learners understand and practise their phrasal verbs.
 Phrasal Verb Demon. Making sense of phrasal verbs.

English grammar
Verb types
Lexical units